This is a list of films produced by the Tollywood (Telugu language film industry) based in Hyderabad in the year 1987.

Top Grossing films
 Pasivadi Pranam
 dongamogudu
 Aha Naa Pellanta
 
 Muvva Gopaludu
 Majnu
 Swayam Krushi
 Srinivasa Kalyanam 
 Bhale Mogudu
 Makutemleni Maharaju 
 Shrutilayalu
 Pushpaka Vimana

1987

1987
Telugu
Telugu films